Lenville is an unincorporated community in Latah County, in the U.S. state of Idaho.

History
A post office called Lenville was established in 1890, and remained in operation until it was discontinued in 1901. Leonard "Len" Nichols, the first postmaster, gave the community its name.

References

Unincorporated communities in Latah County, Idaho
Unincorporated communities in Idaho